Danny Thomas (1912–1991), was an American comedian, actor and philanthropist.

Danny Thomas may also refer to:

 Danny Thomas (footballer, born 1961), English international footballer for Tottenham Hotspur
 Danny Thomas (footballer, born 1981), English footballer
 Danny Thomas (footballer, born 1985), Welsh footballer
 Danny Thomas (musician), drummer for the 13th Floor Elevators
 Danny Thomas (tennis), American tennis player
 Danny Thomas (baseball), Major League Baseball player

See also
 Daniel Thomas (disambiguation)